Corey Muirhead (June 23, 1983 in St. James, Jamaica) is a Canadian professional basketball player, currently playing for BK Pardubice in the Mattoni NBL in the Czech Republic. He previously played for Cholet Basket in 2007 and the Western Carolina Catamounts men's basketball team from 2002 to 2006. Muirhead attended Milliken Mills High School in Markham, Ontario, Canada.

References

External links

1983 births
Living people
Basketball people from Ontario
Black Canadian basketball players
Canadian expatriate basketball people in the United States
Canadian expatriate basketball people in France
Canadian men's basketball players
Cholet Basket players
Jamaican men's basketball players
People from Saint James Parish, Jamaica
Western Carolina Catamounts men's basketball players